Loxaspilates is a genus of moths in the family Geometridae.

Species
Loxaspilates arrizanaria  Bastelberger, 1909
Loxaspilates atrisquamata  Hampson, 1907
Loxaspilates biformata  Inoue, 1983
Loxaspilates densihastigera  Inoue, 1983
Loxaspilates dispar  Warren, 1893
Loxaspilates duplicata  Sterneck, 1928
Loxaspilates fixseni  (Alpheraky, 1892)
Loxaspilates formosanus  Matsumura, 1911
Loxaspilates graeseri  Prout, 1920
Loxaspilates hastigera  (Butler, 1889)
Loxaspilates imitata  (Bastelberger, 1909)
Loxaspilates montuosa  Inoue, 1983
Loxaspilates nakajimai  Inoue, 1983
Loxaspilates obliquaria  (Moore, 1868)
Loxaspilates straminearia  Leech, 1897
Loxaspilates tenuipicta  Wehrli, 1953
Loxaspilates torcida  Dognin, 1900
Loxaspilates triumbrata  (Warren, 1895)
Loxaspilates unidiluta  Inoue, 1987

References
Natural History Museum Lepidoptera genus database

Ennominae